These are the main rivers of Belize. Belize has a total of 35 major and minor river catchments or watersheds which drain into the Caribbean Sea.

Rivers

Resources

 
 (includes map of watersheds)

Belize
Rivers
Belize